The Alma Staker House, at 81 E. 300 South in Mount Pleasant, Utah, was built around 1870.  It was listed on the National Register of Historic Places in 1979.

It illustrates "syncretism", i.e. the synthesis of Eastern style, with Western materials.  It is an adobe house with vernacular Greek Revival style.  It has a "temple-form" or "up-right and wing" house plan, i.e. a one-and-a-half-story gabled central unit, one room wide and two deep, flanked by smaller one-story wings.

References

National Register of Historic Places in Sanpete County, Utah
Greek Revival architecture in Utah
Houses completed in 1870